The 9th Africa Movie Academy Awards ceremony honouring movies of 2012 was held in Yenagoa, Bayelsa State on 20 April 2013. The event was hosted by actress and former AMAA winner Ama K. Abebrese and Ayo Makun with many celebrities in attendance. The awards' nomination party was held in Lilongwe, Malawi; it was hosted by Her Excellency, President Joyce Banda. A total of 671 films were submitted for consideration across Africa, America, Canada, France, Germany, Guadalupe, Italy, Jamaica, and the United Kingdom. Confusion Na Wa won the best picture award. The late Justus Esiri was awarded the Best Actor in a leading role posthumously.

Winners and nominees 
A total of 29 award categories were given out. Below is a full list of all the winners. Winners are listed first and highlighted in boldface:

Awards 
{| class="wikitable"
|-
! style="background:#EEDD82; width:50%" | Best Short Film
! style="background:#EEDD82; width:50%" | Best Documentary
|-
| valign="top" |
 Kwaku Ananse : Ghana Dead River : Namibia
 Elegy For A Revolutionary : South Africa
 Yellow Fever : Kenya
 Nhamo : Zimbabwe
 Big Daddy : Nigeria
 Release : South Africa
 Burnt Forest : Kenya
| valign="top" |
 Fuelling Poverty : Nigeria Gun to Tape : Kenya
 Swimming The Zambezi : South Africa
 Give Me Back My Home : Kenya
 The African Cypher Fly On The Wall: South Africa
|-
! style="background:#EEDD82; width:50%" | Best Diaspora Feature
! style="background:#EEDD82; width:50%" | Best Diaspora Documentary
|-
| valign="top" |
 Stones In The Sun : Haiti / United States Against The Grain : United States
 Between Friends: Trinidad / Tobago
| valign="top" |
  Fan Do Brasil : Guadeloupe / Brasil My Thiero Boys : United States
 Red, White, Black And Blue : United States
|-
! style="background:#EEDD82; width:50%" | Best Animation
! style="background:#EEDD82; width:50%" | Best Film by an African Abroad
|-
| valign="top" |
 Adventures Of Zambezia : South Africa Tageni’s Dol : Namibia
 Mission Impossible : Nigeria
 Oba : Nigeria
 Lion Of Judah : South Africa
| valign="top" |
 Last Flight to Abuja: United Kingdom / Nigeria Turning Point : United States / Nigeria
 The Assassin's Practice : United Kingdom / Nigeria
 Bianca : United States / Nigeria
 Woolwich Boys : United Kingdom / Nigeria
|-
! style="background:#EEDD82; width:50%" | Achievement in Production Design
! style="background:#EEDD82; width:50%" | Achievement in Costume Design
|-
| valign="top" |
  Elelwani
 Virgin Magarida
 The Twin Sword
 Contract
 Blood and Henna
 Okoro The Prince
| valign="top" |
 Blood and Henna The Twin Sword
 Elelwani
 Virgin Magarida
 The Meeting
 Cobweb
|-
! style="background:#EEDD82; width:50%" | Achievement in Makeup
! style="background:#EEDD82; width:50%" | Achievement in Soundtrack
|-
| valign="top" |
 The Meeting The Twin Sword
 Elelwani
 Ninah’s Dowry
 Okoro The Prince
 Uhlanga, The Mark
| valign="top" |
  The Last Fishing Boat Journey to Self
 Okoro The Prince
 Hoodrush
 Nairobi Half Life
 The Twin Sword
|-
! style="background:#EEDD82; width:50%" | Achievement in Visual Effects
! style="background:#EEDD82; width:50%" | Achievement in Sound
|-
| valign="top" |
 The Twin Sword Okoro The Prince
 Elelwani
 Last Flight to Abuja
 Uhlanga, The Mark
 Awakening
| valign="top" |
 Nairobi Half Life Last Flight to Abuja
 Streets Of Calabar
 Heroes and Zeros
 Zama Zama
 Virgin Magarida
|-
! style="background:#EEDD82; width:50%" | Achievement in Cinematography
! style="background:#EEDD82; width:50%" | Achievement in Editing
|-
| valign="top" |
 Uhlanga the Mark Virgin Magarida
 Nairobi Half Life
 Swirl In Bamako
 The Twin Sword
 Elelwani
| valign="top" |
 Heroes and Zeros Last Flight to Abuja
 Contract
 Elelwani
 Nairobi Half Life
 Uhlanga the Mark
|-
! style="background:#EEDD82; width:50%" | Achievement in Lighting
! style="background:#EEDD82; width:50%" | Achievement in Screenplay
|-
| valign="top" |
  Moi Zaphira Zama Zama
 Flower Girl
 Elelwani
 Uhlanga The Mark
| valign="top" |
  Heroes and Zeros Contract
 Ninah’s Dowry
 Alan Poza
 Blood and Henna
 Zama Zama
|-
! style="background:#EEDD82; width:50%" | Best Nigerian film
! style="background:#EEDD82; width:50%" | Best film in an African Language
|-
| valign="top" |
 Confusion Na Wa Blood and Henna
 Heroes and Zeros
 The Meeting
 The Twin Sword
 Kokomma
 Okoro The Prince
| valign="top" |
 Moi Zaphira : Burkina Faso Elelwani : South Africa
 The Last Fishing Boat : Malawi
 Nairobi Half Life : Kenya
 Blood and Henna : Nigeria
 Sherifa : Togo
 Kokomma: Nigeria
|-
! style="background:#EEDD82; width:50%" | Best Child Actor
! style="background:#EEDD82; width:50%" | Most Promising Actor
|-
| valign="top" |
 The Ugandan Cobweb
 Imbabazi, The Pardon
 Ninah’s Dowry
 Swirl In Bamako
 Salimatu Traore (moi Zaphira)
| valign="top" |
 Joseph Wairimu : Nairobi Half Life (co-winner)
 Belinda Effah : Kokomma (co-winner)
 Sumela Maculuva : Virgin Magarida
 Shonelo Mbutho : Ulanga The Mark
 Karoumwi Olakunle : The Twin Sword
|-
! style="background:#EEDD82; width:50%" | Best Actor In A Supporting Role
! style="background:#EEDD82; width:50%" | Best Actress In A Supporting Role
|-
| valign="top" |
 Gabriel Afolayan : Hoodrush
 Ali Nuhu : Blood and Henna
 Olwenya Maina : Nairobi Half Life
 Alfred Atungu : The Twin Sword
 Ikponmwosa Gold : Confusion Na Wa
| valign="top" |
  Hermelinda Cimela : Virgin Magarida
 Patience Ozokwor: Turning Point
 Linda Ejiofor : The Meeting
 Crista Eka : Ninah’s Dowry
 Foluke Daramola : Cobweb
|-
! style="background:#EEDD82; width:50%" | Best Actor In A Leading Role
! style="background:#EEDD82; width:50%" | Best Actress In A Leading Role
|-
| valign="top" |
  Justus Esiri : The Assassin's Practice OC Ukeje : Alan Poza
 Bimbo Manuel : Heroes and Zeros
 Lindani Nkosi : Zama Zama
 Hlomla Dandala : Contract
 Femi Jacobs : The Meeting
 Amurin Wumnembom : Ninah’s Dowry
| valign="top" |
  Florence Masebe : Elelwani  Yvonne Okoro : Contract
  Mariam Ouedraogo : Moi Zaphira
  Rita Dominic : The Meeting
  Mbutung Seikeh : Ninah's Diary
  Flora Suya : Last Fishing Boat
|-
! style="background:#EEDD82; width:50%" | Best Director
! style="background:#EEDD82; width:50%" | Best film
|-
| valign="top" |
 Niji Akanni : Heroes And Zeroes Kenneth Gyang : Confusion Na Wa
 Shemu Joyah : The Last Fishing Boat
 Shirley Frimpong-Manso: Contract
 David 'Tosh' Gitonga : Nairobi Half Life
 Ntshavheni Wa Luruli : Elelwani
| valign="top" |
  Confusion Na Wa : Nigeria'''
 Nairobi Half Life : Kenya
 Ninah’s Dowry : Cameroon
 The Last Fishing Boat : Malawi
 Virgin Margarida : Mozambique
 Elelwani : South Africa
 Last Flight to Abuja : Nigeria
|}

Honorary awards

Lifetime Achievement Awards
 Tunde Kelani
 Chief Eddi Ugbomah
 Sir Ositadinma Okeke Oguno (Ossy Affason)
 Ayuko Badu
 Chief Pete Edochie

Special Recognition of Pillars of Nollywood
 Emem Isong
 Kanayo O. Kanayo
 Kenneth Okonkwo
 Film/Video Producers and Marketers Association of Nigeria (FVPMAN)

Special Jury Award
 Ninah’s Dairy'' (Cameroon)

References

Africa Movie Academy Awards
Africa Movie Academy Awards
Africa Movie Academy Awards ceremonies
Award
Africa Movie Academy Awards